The 2017 Spengler Cup was a men's ice hockey competition being held in Davos, Switzerland from December 26 to December 31, 2017. All matches were being played at HC Davos's home known as Vaillant Arena.

Six competing teams were split into two groups of three (in the round-robin series). The two groups, named Torriani and Cattini, are named after legendary Swiss hockey players Richard 'Bibi' Torriani and the Cattini brothers, Hans and Ferdinand.

Teams participating
The list of teams that are participating in the tournament are as listed.

  HC Davos (host)
  Team Canada
  Team Switzerland
  HPK
  Dinamo Riga
  Mountfield HK

Match officials
The officials who are named to the tournament are as listed.

Group stage

Key
 W (regulation win) – 3 pts.
 OTW (overtime/shootout win) – 2 pts.
 OTL (overtime/shootout loss) – 1 pt.
 L (regulation loss) – 0 pts.

Group Torriani

Group Cattini

Knockout stage

Quarterfinals

Semifinals

Final

Champions

All-Star Team

Source:

References

Spengler Cup
Spengler Cup
Spengler Cup